Karl Heinz Stroux  (25 February 1908 – 2 August 1985) was a German actor, film and theatre director, and theatre manager. As the director of the Düsseldorfer Schauspielhaus from 1955 to 1972 he opened the new building in 1970.

Career 

Born Karl-Heinz Stroux, the son of a physician, in Hamborn (now a district in the city of Duisburg), he studied in Berlin, history and philosophy until 1930. From 1928 to 1930 he worked as an assistant to stage directors Karlheinz Martin and Jürgen Fehling, and as an actor. From 1930 to 1934 he worked at several Berlin theatres including Deutsches Theater and the  where he staged Eugene O'Neill's  as a studio production. By the late 1940s he had been a senior director at several German theatres including ones in Darmstadt, Berlin (Hebbel-Theater) and Wiesbaden. From 1951 to 1955 he was the senior director at Berlin's Schiller Theater and Schlosspark Theater. At the Schlosspark, he directed the German premiere of Samuel Beckett's Waiting for Godot in 1953 with the author in the audience.

He staged the premiere in German of Beckett's Happy Days in Düsseldorf in 1961. He also worked closely with the playwrights Eugène Ionesco and Heinrich Böll. His actors included Bernhard Minetti and Ernst Schröder, Elisabeth Bergner, Elisabeth Flickenschildt, Paula Wessely, Ernst Deutsch and Fritz Kortner. His production of Ionesco's  was performed in the first Berliner Theatertreffen (Berlin theatre meeting) in 1964. He also staged works by Arthur Miller and Sławomir Mrożek. Occasionally he still acted, for example as narrator in Shakespeare's Perikles at age 77.

Stroux died in Düsseldorf. On the occasion of his centenary in 2008, Düsseldorf arranged an exhibition of his 50 years of work for the theatre.

Filmography

References

20th-century German male actors
German theatre managers and producers
German theatre directors
1908 births
1985 deaths
Knights Commander of the Order of Merit of the Federal Republic of Germany